Q.R.R (Quien resulte responsable) ("Whoever is Responsible") is a 1970 Mexican film. It was directed by Gustavo Alatriste.

External links
 

1970 films
Mexican documentary films
1970s Spanish-language films
Films directed by Gustavo Alatriste
1970s Mexican films